Kwon Na-ra (changed her name legally to Kwon Ah-yoon, known by her birth name Nara), is a South Korean singer and actress. She is best known as one of the original members of the South Korean girl group Hello Venus.

Career

Beginnings and acting debut 
Nara became an acting trainee for Fantagio Entertainment when she was in middle school.  She joined the girl group Hello Venus as a founding member where she went by the stage name "Nara". They debuted on May 9, 2012, with the mini-album Venus, which contained four tracks. The single "Venus" reached number 35 on the Gaon chart.

Aside from her group activities, Nara appeared as a cameo role as a stewardess on the 20th episode of the SBS drama Take Care of Us, Captain with fellow Hello Venus member, Yooyoung.

2017–present: Rise in popularity and lead roles 
In 2017, Nara played her first major acting role in SBS's romantic comedy drama Suspicious Partner.

In 2018, Nara starred tvN's melodrama My Mister, followed by SBS legal drama Your Honor.

In 2019, Nara got her first lead role in the KBS' medical prison drama Doctor Prisoner.

In June 2019, Nara signed with new agency A-Man Project.

In 2020, she starred in JTBC drama Itaewon Class, based on the webtoon of the same name. The series was a commercial success and became the seventh highest-rated Korean dramas in cable television history. She was also cast in historical comedy TV series Royal Secret Agent as Hong Da-In, a courtesan whose beauty is comparable to Hwang Jini.

In March 2021, Nara was confirmed to be starring in tvN's fantasy drama Bulgasal: Immortal Souls. in the role of Min Sang-woon, a woman who used to be an immortal, but goes through a tragic event that turns her into a human. The drama premiered in December 2021.

In June 2022, Nara signed with new agency C-JeS Entertainment.

In September 2022, Nara joined an essemble casts featuring actors from television dramas   Love in the Moonlight, Itaewon Class, and The Sound of Magic in the TVING-produced reality tv show Young Actors' Retreat.

Discography

Filmography

Film

Television series

Web series

Television shows

Web shows

Awards and nominations

Listicles

References

External links 
 
Kwon Nara on Instagram

1991 births
Living people
Pledis Entertainment artists
Fantagio artists
South Korean women pop singers
South Korean television actresses
Hello Venus members
Musicians from Incheon
South Korean female idols
21st-century South Korean singers
21st-century South Korean women singers